Ana Trutić (born 7 December 1998) is a Montenegrin footballer who plays as a defender. She has been a member of the Montenegro women's national team.

References

1998 births
Living people
Women's association football defenders
Montenegrin women's footballers
Montenegro women's international footballers